Liberty Township is one of the seventeen townships of Highland County, Ohio, United States. As of the 2010 census the population was 10,242, of whom 3,637 lived in the unincorporated portion of the township.

Geography
Located in the center of the county, it borders the following townships:
Penn Township - north
Paint Township - east
Marshall Township - southeast
Washington Township - south
New Market Township - southwest
Union Township - northwest

The city of Hillsboro, the county seat of Highland County, is located in Liberty Township.

Name and history
It is one of twenty-five Liberty Townships statewide.

Government
The township is governed by a three-member board of trustees, who are elected in November of odd-numbered years to a four-year term beginning on the following January 1. Two are elected in the year after the presidential election and one is elected in the year before it. There is also an elected township fiscal officer, who serves a four-year term beginning on April 1 of the year after the election, which is held in November of the year before the presidential election. Vacancies in the fiscal officership or on the board of trustees are filled by the remaining trustees.

References

External links
County website

Townships in Highland County, Ohio
Townships in Ohio